The Bandini Saloncino is a racing car, built in 1968 by Bandini Automobili in Forlì, Italy.

The new sports coupé was presented at the "Salone Internazionale dell'Automobile di Torino" (International car show of Turin) in 1968, but its manufacturer Ilario Bandini with irony, given the small size of its Berlinetta and little sympathy for the suffix "-one" (meaning "big"), renamed the Sports Coupé 1000 with the nickname "Saloncino" (little saloon).

The birth of the Saloncino plays an important role in the production history of Bandini, as the company's first sports coupé. It has, under a distinct body, a new front suspension and a chassis, with only similarities to its relative, the 1000/66.

The Saloncino was also the test car for the first downdraught-carburetted 1300 cc engine.

The chassis

The frame, designed and built by Ilario Bandini, although based on the recent progenitor 1000/66, has a new structure of frame tubes in which the engine takes substantial force. The design also featured in the subsequent s.p. 1000/72.

The front suspension presents a classic triangle below and a new trapeze above.
 Structure and material: frame of elliptical section tubes, special steel of aeronautical derivation; patent No. 499843.
 Suspension:
 Front: Independent, a triangle and trapeze overlapped with hydraulic telescopic shock absorbers, tilted and with cylindrical helical coaxial springs; anti-roll bar
 Rear: independent, swinging arms and triangles lower hydraulic telescopic shock absorbers, inclined agents and cylindrical helical coaxial springs, camber caster and convergence adjustable anti-roll bar
 Braking system:
 Service: hydraulic discs front and rear
 Steering:  rack and pinion
 Drive: left-hand drive
 Wheels: Amadori and Campagnolo aluminium alloys
 Fuel tank: 
 Transmission: Colotti

The Bandini DOHC 1000 engine

The power exchange differential is the same as that which equips the 1000/66.
 Positioning: longitudinal rear mounted engine, 4-cylinder in-line
 Materials and specifics: a mixed distribution: chain gears, on DOHC aluminium cylinder head, 8 valves, hemispherical, cast iron five bearing monoblock, unique alloy cast sump in aluminium
 Bore: 68 mm
 Stroke: 68 mm
 Displacement: 987 cc
 Compression ratio: 9.5:1
 Power: 2 twin-choke Weber carburetor  38DCO3 downdraught carburettors
 Power:  @ 8500 rpm
 Lubrication: Carter with wet gear pump and external filter 
 Cooling: forced liquid with centrifugal pump-driven belt and pulley, 2 aluminium coolers at the rear
 Gearbox and clutch: 5 speed + Rg clutch; single dry disc
 Ignition and electrical equipment: coil and distributor on the head, battery 12 V and generator

The body

The body sports coupé, produced by Bandini completely in alloy, allegedly closely follows that of the Barchetta of 1966.

The front is very similar to the predecessor, but to make the organic roof and windscreen, the bonnet is more inclined and acquires a convexity shared with the rest of the body. Consequently, the doors have a greater height, but remain unchanged in their shape, as does the rear engine cover, which maintains the air side but not higher.

The upper part of the rear engine cover is entirely dominated by a long and convex back window that leaves nice view of the engine and mechanics. It forgiveness instead tilted the slits near the rear wheels basically unchanged while the transparent tail is intended to capture the eyes of onlookers.

The original black and silver livery was replaced at the end of seventies with the current "racing red" (Italy's national racing color).

See also
 Ilario Bandini
 Bandini Cars

External links 
Bandini Saloncino Video
Bandini Saloncino Video 2

Bandini vehicles
Sports racing cars
1970s cars
1960s cars
Cars introduced in 1968